Georges de Bourguignon (15 February 1910 – 31 December 1989) was a Belgian fencer. He won a bronze medal in the team foil event at the 1948 Summer Olympics.

References

External links
 

1910 births
1989 deaths
Belgian male fencers
Olympic fencers of Belgium
Fencers at the 1932 Summer Olympics
Fencers at the 1936 Summer Olympics
Fencers at the 1948 Summer Olympics
Fencers at the 1952 Summer Olympics
Olympic bronze medalists for Belgium
Olympic medalists in fencing
People from Woluwe-Saint-Lambert
Medalists at the 1948 Summer Olympics
Sportspeople from Brussels